Vincenzo Monaldi (16 April 1899, in Monte Vidon Combatte, Province of Fermo – 7 November 1969) was an Italian physician and physiologist. His family lived in Grottazzolina, some of his relatives still live there, two brothers Giulio and Francesco Monaldi emigrated to Argentina.

Biography
He fought in the First World War, while he studied, obtaining a military award, the Croce di Guerra. In 1925 he obtained his medicine degree and specialized in treating Tuberculosis and illness of the respiratory system. He established the academic journal "Archivio di fisiologia", which is still one of the top journals in the field, now called "Monaldi Archives of Chest Disease." He gathered international fame and was named member of the Royal Society of Medicine in London and others in Italy and Germany. He was assistant at the Physiology Institute of Rome, then he went on to Naples as professor and director of "Principe di Piemonte" sanatorium (now "Ospedale Monaldi").

Political life
He was Mayor of his home town Grottazzolina when he was just 20 years old, the youngest mayor in Italy. He joined the Italian People's Party of Don Luigi Sturzo then the Democrazia Cristiana. He was elected senator in 1948, holding important positions in government until he became High Commissioner for Hygiene and then became the first Italian Minister of Health in the Fanfani II Cabinet.

Last years
When Vincenzo Monaldi left political activity, he returned to practice as a doctor and teacher. He died in Naples in 1969. Today, the "Principe di Piemonte" sanatorium is named after him.

References

1899 births
1969 deaths
People from the Province of Fermo
Christian Democracy (Italy) politicians
Italian Ministers of Health
Senators of Legislature I of Italy
Senators of Legislature II of Italy
Senators of Legislature III of Italy
Senators of Legislature IV of Italy
Politicians of Marche
Italian physiologists
Italian hospital administrators
Academic staff of the University of Naples Federico II
Italian military personnel of World War I
Grand Officers of the Order of Merit of the Italian Republic